Stephen "Steve" Shaw (born 1 January 1963) is a former professional tennis player from England who competed for Great Britain.

Career
While studying sports medicine, Shaw played college tennis for the University of Alabama, from 1980 to 1982.

Shaw made his first big impression on the Grand Prix tennis circuit in 1985, when he made the final four at a tournament in Marbella. He had to retire hurt during his semi-final with Horacio de la Peña. The Englishman also reached quarter-finals in the 1987 Bordeaux Open and 1988 Bristol Open. He made the second round of a Grand Slam event on four occasions, with wins over Claudio Panatta, Damir Keretić, Todd Witsken and Carl Turich. He managed to take a set off Jimmy Connors in their second round meeting at the 1987 Wimbledon Championships.

In doubles, Shaw teamed up with David Felgate in 1985 to win the Bordeaux Open. His best Grand Slam doubles performances were made in the 1988 Wimbledon Championships, where he reached the third round of the men's doubles, partnering John Lloyd, as well as the second round of the mixed doubles, with Catarina Lindqvist. Shaw and Lloyd's run to the third round included a win over seventh seeds Paul Annacone and Christo van Rensburg.

He took part in four Davis Cup ties for Great Britain during his career, two against Yugoslavia and one each against Portugal and Austria. He won three of his eight rubbers, which all came in Great Britain's win over Portugal at Nottingham in 1985.

Grand Prix career finals

Doubles: 1 (1–0)

Challenger titles

Singles: (1)

Doubles: (1)

References

External links
 
 
 

1963 births
Living people
English male tennis players
Alabama Crimson Tide men's tennis players
People from Enfield, London
British male tennis players
Tennis people from Greater London